Lolita Markovna Milyavskaya (née Горелик (Gorelik); ; born 14 November 1963) is a Russian singer, actress, TV and film director of Ukrainian origin. She is better known under her stage name Lolita. She was born in Mukachevo, Zakarpattia Oblast, Ukraine.

In 2017 Milyavskaya was forbidden to enter Ukraine for a term of three years because she performed in Crimea in 2015 (the Ukrainian territory Crimea was annexed by Russia in 2014). In January 2023, Ukraine imposed sanctions on Lolita for her support of 2022 Russian invasion of Ukraine.

Discography

as part of cabaret-duo "Akademiya"

Studio albums

EPs

DVD-Albums

Collections

Soundtracks

Singles

Videography

Filmography

Movies

Television

References

External links

Lolita Milyavskaya at the Forbes

1963 births
Living people
People from Mukachevo
Soviet women singers
Russian pop singers
Russian LGBT rights activists
Russian people of Ukrainian descent
20th-century Russian women singers
20th-century Russian singers
Winners of the Golden Gramophone Award